HMS Arethusa was a second-class cruiser of the , which served with the Royal Navy.  She was built at Napier, Glasgow, being laid down in 1880, launched in 1882 and completed in financial year 1886–87.  She remained in ordinary reserve at Chatham, being commissioned for the 1887, 1888, 1889, 1890, and 1892 annual manoeuvres. She served in the Mediterranean from 1893 to 1896, was commissioned for the 1899 annual manoeuvres, then recommissioned for the Pacific, and later sent as a reinforcement to the China Station during the Boxer Rebellion until she came home for the last time in 1903.

Construction

Arethusa was built at Napier, Glasgow, and completed in financial year 1886–87.

The December 1885 Navy List listed her as at Chatham, with her commissioned and warrant officers borne in Pembroke as follows:

Sea-going career

She lay in ordinary at Chatham after completion.

1887 annual manoeuvres
Arethusa was commissioned for the 1887 annual manoeuvres on 8 July 1887, and paid off on 1 September 1887.

1888 annual manoeuvres
Arethusa was commissioned for the 1888 annual manoeuvres on 4 July 1888, and paid off on 31 August 1888.  Arethusa was part of Vice Admiral John K.E. Baird's fleet. In the manoeuvres, hostilities broke out at noon on 24 July 1888, and ended at noon on 20 August. Baird's force represented the British fleet, and England, Scotland and Wales were considered friendly to the British fleet and hostile to the enemy. Opposing Baird was the 'Achil' fleet, led by Rear Admiral George Tryon, and based in Berehaven on the south-west coast of Ireland and Lough Swilly on the north coast.  All Irish territory was considered hostile to the British fleet and friendly to the enemy.  At the outset Baird's fleet was concentrated on keeping Tryon's fleet shut up in their base ports.  They failed.  Both Tryon and his second in command broke the blockade on 4 August, and swooping round the extremities of Ireland, made a descent on British commerce and British ports. In the manoeuvres, the Arethusa was assessed as lost on 5 August.

The committee appointed to inquire into all circumstances connected with the 1888 British naval manoeuvres reported as follows:

In the 1888 manoeuvres, "the proportion of untrained (2nd Class) stokers which were draughted to several of the ships appears to have been too large." The opinion of the captain of Arethusa was that the "engine room complement [was] insufficient by 2 engine room artificers, 2 leading stokers, and 23 stokers."

"...the Committee think it right to call special attention to certain remarks contained in the report of the captain who lately commanded this ship.
He considers the Arethusa a good sea-boat, and that she steams well against a moderate head sea and strong wind, but that she rolls heavily when the sea is abeam or abaft; she is therefore unsteady as a gun-platform under these conditions, and, on account of her quick and heavy rolling, 'accurate shooting would be an impossibility, and machine guns in the tops would be useless.'
Among the many suggestions made for improving her efficiency, the following refer especially to the reduction of top weight:-
Removal of square rig on foremast.
Removal of fighting tops.

The captain does not himself suggest that the armament should be lightened; but Admiral Baird's opinion, that all cruisers appear to be too heavily armed, applies to this vessel as well as to the Mersey class, and in this opinion the Committee concur.
Three other suggestions from the same officer are noted as specially worthy of consideration, viz.:-
To enlarge the rudder.
To extend the upper bridge out to the ship's side in order to obtain a view right aft.
To fit a search light on the poop, as a torpedo-boat coming up astern cannot be kept in the beam of the ones on the fore-bridge."

The First Naval Lord, Admiral Sir Arthur Hood commented on this as follows:

"The proposal to remove the square rig on the foremast, and the fighting tops, in order to reduce top weight I do not concur in; the square rig on the foremast is a decided advantage to vessels of this class, and would enable them to save coal when cruising on a foreign station; the value of the guns mounted in the fighting tops would be considerable when engaged with cruisers, and therefore I would retain them."'

1889 annual manoeuvres
Arethusa was commissioned for the 1889 annual manoeuvres on 18 July 1889, and paid off on 14 September 1889.

1890 annual manoeuvres
Arethusa was commissioned for the 1890 annual manoeuvres on 22 July 1890, and paid off on 11 September 1890.

1892 annual manoeuvres
Arethusa was commissioned for the 1892 annual manoeuvres on 21 July 1892, and paid off on 8 September 1892. During the manoeuvres she suffered engine problems, with a burst steam pipe delaying departure from Queenstown on 3 August and on 10 August she had a failure of the low pressure on her port engine, with Arethusa continuing on the power of one engine. On the night of 10/11 August, a small second-class torpedo boat which had just been lowered from Arethusas davits, was struck by the cruiser's propeller and badly damaged, with the hull being split almost to the keel. Arethusa rescued the torpedo boat's crew and recovered the torpedo boat.

1893-1896
Arethusa was commissioned at Chatham, 16 May 1893, and the served in the Mediterranean. She paid off at Chatham on 22 July 1896. The January 1895 Navy List listed her commissioned and warrant officers as follows:

1896-1899
Arethusa laid in ordinary at Chatham from 23 July 1896 to 10 July 1899.

1899 annual manoeuvres
Arethusa was commissioned at Chatham on 11 July 1899 for the annual manoeuvres, and paid off on 13 August. The August 1899 Navy List listed her commissioned and warrant officers for the annual manoeuvres as follows:

1899-1903
Arethusa was commissioned at Chatham on 14 November 1899 by Captain James Startin. Initially she served on the Pacific Station, where she visited Callao in March 1900. The following year she was sent out as a reinforcement to the China Station for the protection of the lives and property of British subjects during the Boxer Rebellion. This commission was the subject of a book in the 'Log' series, entitled: HMS Arethusa, went Round the World, 1899–1903.

The British fleet on the China Station in March 1901 was commanded by Vice-Admiral Sir Edward H. Seymour, G.C.B. in Centurion, with Rear-Admiral Sir James A.T. Bruce, K.C.M.G. second in command, and consisted of:
Battleships: Barfleur, Centurion, Glory, Goliath, Ocean.
1st Class cruisers: Argonaut, Aurora, Blenheim, Endymion, Orlando , Terrible, Undaunted **.
2nd Class cruisers: Arethusa ‡, Astraea ‡, Bonaventure, Dido ‡, Hermione, lsis ‡, Pique.
3rd Class cruisers: Alacrity, Wallaroo ‡.
Destroyers: Fame, Hart, Otter, Whiting.
Sloops: Algerine, Daphne, Phoenix, Rosario.
Gunvessel: Linnet.
Gunboats: Bramble, Brisk, Britomart, Esk , Lizard ‡, Pigmy, Plover, Redpole.
Storeship: Humber.
Receiving ship Hong Kong: Tamar (flagship of the Commodore in charge at Hong Kong, Commodore Francis Powell, C.B)
River steamers: Robin, Sandpiper, Snipe, Woodcock, Woodlark.

** Ordered home.

‡ Temporarily attached to China Station.

The March 1901 Navy List listed her commissioned and warrant officers as follows (she was temporarily attached to the China Station at the time):

Disposal
Arethusa was sold on 4 April 1905.

References

 The Naval Annual, various issues.
 Brown, David K.   Warrior to Dreadnought, Warship Development 1860–1905, published Chatham Publishing, 1997.  
 Blueprints
 Chesneau, Roger, and Eugene M. Kolesnik, eds. All the World's Fighting Ships 1860–1905, published Conway Maritime Press, 1979.  
 Jane, Fred T All the World's Fighting Ships, 1900
 Lyon, David and Winfield, Rif The Sail and Steam Navy List, All the Ships of the Royal Navy 1815–1889, published Chatham, 2004,

Footnotes

Arethusa Logbooks in the UK National Archives

 

Leander-class cruisers (1882)
Ships built on the River Clyde
1882 ships